Rahul K. Parikh is an American pediatrician practicing in the San Francisco Bay Area, and who is also employed by Kaiser Permanente in Walnut Creek, California, as the associate Physician-in-Chief of Patient Education in the Diablo Service Area. He writes a regular column, called "PopRX", for Salon about various medicine-related topics. He has also written for CNN about how vaccines do not cause autism, and how important he considers it to be for parents to get their children vaccinated, and for the Los Angeles Times about the effectiveness of workplace wellness programs. Parikh has also written an article for The New York Times about neonatal intensive care units and whether or not prematurely-born infants born between 23 and 26 weeks of gestation should be resuscitated.

Biography 
Parikh grew up in Orange County, California, and attended the University of California, Berkeley, where he received a degree in molecular biology. After graduating, he took a year off from college, attended Tufts University School of Medicine, and completed his residency in pediatrics, first at Cedars-Sinai Medical Center, and then at a hospital in Mumbai.

Defender of vaccination 
Parikh is an outspoken defender of vaccinations, and has described anti-vaccine pediatrician Robert Sears as someone whose "understanding of vaccines is deeply flawed," that his Vaccine Book "is a nightmare for pediatricians like me," and "is peppered with misleading innuendo and factual errors." He also writes that "Sears misleads parents," using "tactics [like] soft science, circular logic, reporting rumors and outright falsehoods."

Personal life 
Parikh is married and has two daughters.

References

External links 
 

American pediatricians
Living people
People from Orange County, California
University of California, Berkeley alumni
Tufts University School of Medicine alumni
American medical journalists
Journalists from California
Year of birth missing (living people)